Mike Creekmore (born January 7, 1964) is an American politician who served in the Arkansas House of Representatives from 1999 to 2005.

References

1964 births
Living people
Democratic Party members of the Arkansas House of Representatives